Þingeyraklaustur was a monastery of the Order of Saint Benedict located in Þingeyrar on Iceland from 1133 until 1551. It was the first convent in Iceland and likely the last to be closed by the Icelandic Reformation.

History
The convent was founded by bishop Jón Ögmundsson in 1106, but it was not inaugurated until 1133, when its first abbot, Vilmundur Þórólfsson, was officially installed in office. Jón Ögmundsson assured the monastery an income from all farms between Hrútafjörður and Vatnsdalsá.

Þingeyraklaustur was one of the largest and richest of the convents on Iceland. It was a famous center of literature, culture and education, and was known for its library. Arngrímr Brandsson, Karl Jónsson, Gunnlaugr Leifsson and Oddr Snorrason were all members of the convent and active as writers here, and the writer Styrmer Kåresson is believed to have been educated here. A large number of Sagas of Icelanders were either produced or copied here, and the famous Bandamanna saga, Grettis saga, Hallfreðar saga, Heiðarvíga saga, Kormáks saga, and Vatnsdæla saga are all likely to have been produced here.

In 1402, the Black Death dissolved the convent as only one of the members survived the plague, effectively emptying it. The monastery therefore ceased operation, and could not be reestablished until 1424 when it was founded again by Ásbjörn Vigfússon as abbot.

During the Icelandic Reformation, the convent survived longer than arguably all other convents on Iceland. It was not officially closed until 1551, when the last abbot Helgi Höskuldsson was formally declared deposed, the convent was banned from accepting novices, and the assets of the monastery declared confiscated. The former monks, however, were allowed to remain for life if they wished, and it is therefore not known when the abbey was actually dissolved.

References 
Janus Jónsson, "Um klaustrin á Islandi. Þingeyraklaustur" i Tímarit hins íslenzka bókmentafélags, 8, 1887.

Christian monasteries established in the 12th century
1133 establishments in Europe
12th-century establishments in Iceland
Monasteries dissolved under the Icelandic Reformation
Benedictine monasteries in Iceland